Milltown is a town in Polk County, Wisconsin, United States. The population was 1,146 at the 2000 census. The village of Milltown is located within the town.

Geography

According to the United States Census Bureau, the town has a total area of 33.5 square miles (86.7 km2), of which, 31.2 square miles (80.9 km2) of it is land and 2.2 square miles (5.8 km2) of it (6.69%) is water.

Demographics
As of the census of 2000, there were 1,146 people, 441 households, and 336 families residing in the town. The population density was 36.7 people per square mile (14.2/km2).  There were 811 housing units at an average density of 26.0 per square mile (10.0/km2). The racial makeup of the town was 98.78% White, 0.26% Black or African American, 0.87% Native American, and 0.09% from two or more races. 0.44% of the population were Hispanic or Latino of any race.

There were 441 households, out of which 31.7% had children under the age of 18 living with them, 67.3% were married couples living together, 6.1% had a female householder with no husband present, and 23.8% were non-families. 17.9% of all households were made up of individuals, and 5.7% had someone living alone who was 65 years of age or older. The average household size was 2.60 and the average family size was 2.94.

In the town, the population was spread out, with 26.3% under the age of 18, 5.5% from 18 to 24, 25.7% from 25 to 44, 29.3% from 45 to 64, and 13.2% who were 65 years of age or older. The median age was 40 years. For every 100 females, there were 109.9 males. For every 100 females age 18 and over, there were 110.7 males.

The median income for a household in the town was $46,944, and the median income for a family was $52,946. Males had a median income of $36,912 versus $25,000 for females. The per capita income for the town was $19,991. About 2.7% of families and 4.1% of the population were below the poverty line, including 4.2% of those under age 18 and 7.1% of those age 65 or over.

References

External links
Town of Milltown, Wisconsin website

Towns in Polk County, Wisconsin
Towns in Wisconsin